Sithu of Pinya (also known as Myinsaing Sithu) was regent of Pinya from 1340 to 1344. He is not mentioned in any of the royal chronicles. He only appears in a Pinya era inscription as "King" Myinsaing Sithu. Sithu, who according to the inscription succeeded Uzana I, may have been a caretaker for his nephew and son-in-law Kyawswa I of Pinya. Sithu's elder daughter Saw Gyi was married to Kyawswa I. At least one contemporary inscription donated by Kyawswa I's chief consort on 17 June 1342 disputes Sithu's claim, saying that Kyawswa I was already king.

The king was likely Kyawswa I's maternal uncle since Kyawswa I's father Thihathu had only two brothers, Athinkhaya and Yazathingyan, both of whom had already died.

References

Bibliography
 
 

Burmese monarchs
Pinya dynasty